William Lithgow (c. 1582 – c. 1645) was a Scottish traveller, writer and alleged spy. He claimed at the end of his various peregrinations to have tramped 36,000 miles (57,936km) on foot.

Life and adventures 
William Lithgow was born at Lanark, the oldest son of the merchant James Lithgow and Alison Grahame, his wife. A family tradition had it that William was discovered in the company of a certain Miss Lockhart, and her four brothers cut off his ears, earning him the nickname "lugless Willie".

Prior to 1610 he had visited Shetland, Switzerland, and Bohemia. In that year he set out from Paris for Rome on the 7 March, where he remained for four weeks before moving on to other parts of Italy: Naples, Ancona, before moving on to Athens, Constantinople, and others. After a three-month stay in Constantinople, he sailed to other Greek localities and then on to Palestine, arriving in Jerusalem on Palm Sunday 1612, and later on to Egypt. 

His next journey, 1614–16, was in Tunis and Fez; but his last, 1619–21, to Spain, ended in his apprehension at Malaga and torture as a spy.

He also visited Crete.

Bibliography

Rare Adventures and Paineful Peregrinations, an account of his travels
The Siege of Breda,
The Siege of Newcastle,
Poems.
A briefe and summarie discourse upon that lamentable and dreadfull disaster at Dunglasse. Anno 1640 (Edinburgh, 1640). A description of the explosion at Dunglass Castle.

References

 Martin Garrett, 'Lithgow, William (b. 1582, d. in or after 1645)', Oxford Dictionary of National Biography, Oxford University Press, 2004 accessed 28 April 2017

Further reading

External links
 

Significant Scots – William Lithgow

1580s births
1645 deaths
Explorers from the Kingdom of Scotland
Scottish spies
Scottish travel writers
People from Lanark
17th-century Scottish writers
1582 in Scotland
17th-century spies